Leistus montanus is a species of ground beetle native to Europe.

Habitat 
Leistus montanus is commonly found in mountain ranges of Central Europe. It has also been found Turkey and Syria.

References

External links
Images representing Leistus montanus  at Barcode of Life Data System

Leistus
Beetles described in 1827
Beetles of Europe